Alfred's blind skink (Dibamus alfredi), also known commonly as Alfred's dibamid lizard, Alfred's limbless skink, and Taylor's limbless skink, is a species of blind lizard in the family Dibamidae. The species is endemic to Southeast Asia.

Related species
Another species of Dibamus once had been referred to as Alfred's blind skink, but is now a separate species, Dibamus dezwaani.

Geographic range
Alfred's blind skink is known with certainty only from Peninsular Thailand. Records from Sabah in Malaysian Borneo represent Dibamus vorisi. The Nias (Indonesia) record represents Dibamus dezwaani.

Habitat
The preferred natural habitats of D. alfredi are monsoonal evergreen forests and mixed dipterocarp forests, where it lives in humus or leaf litter.

Reproduction
D. alfredi is oviparous.

Naming
D. alfredi is named after ichthyologist Eric R. Alfred, who was the director of the Raffles Museum in Singapore (1967–1972).

References

Further reading

Taylor EH (1962). "New Oriental Reptiles". University of Kansas Science Bulletin 43 (7): 209–263. (Dibamus alfredi, new species, pp. 246–248, Figure 13).

Dibamus
Reptiles of Thailand
Reptiles described in 1962
Taxa named by Edward Harrison Taylor